Meadowbrook is an unincorporated community in Madison County, in the U.S. state of Illinois. Meadowbrook is located east of Bethatlo and south of Moro. Meadowbrook is best known for being 90°W from the Prime Meridian. Meadowbrook is also the host of the Bethalto School District school of Meadowbrook Intermediate. Meadowbrook has two postal codes, 62010 and 62067.

References 

Unincorporated communities in Madison County, Illinois
Unincorporated communities in Illinois